Teulisna chiloides is a moth in the family Erebidae. It was described by Francis Walker in 1862. It is found on Peninsular Malaysia, Sumatra, Borneo, Sulawesi and Sumbawa. It has also been recorded from Queensland, Australia. The habitat consists of lowland dipterocarp forests, alluvial forests and lower montane forests.

Subspecies
Teulisna chiloides chiloides (Peninsular Malaysia, Sumatra, Borneo)
Teulisna chiloides dasypyga (Felder, 1874) (Sulawesi)
Teulisna chiloides violitincta (Rothschild, 1912) (Sumbawa)

References

Moths described in 1862
chiloides